BackHome was a magazine that was created in 1990 as a competitor to Mother Earth News after the latter was taken over by a major publisher (and then, ultimately, Ogden Publications). Richard Freudenberger is the co-founder of BackHome. Following the earlier, simpler, style of Mother Earth News, it became a strong competitor in the homesteading and simple living tutorial and instructional print market. The headquarters was in Flat Rock, North Carolina. It was formerly based in Hendersonville, North Carolina.

The magazine was subtitled "Your Hands-On Guide To Sustainable Living".

According to its website, BackHome ceased print publication in 2014.

See also
Similar periodicals
 Backwoods Home Magazine
 Grit
 Natural Life

References

External links
 

Defunct magazines published in the United States
Lifestyle magazines published in the United States
Magazines established in 1990
Magazines disestablished in 2014
Magazines published in North Carolina